Gujjari is a rāga belonging to the tradition of Odissi music. Falling under the meḷa Karnāta, the raga uses komala gandhara, komala dhaibata and komala nisada swaras and is traditionally associated with the karuṇa rasa. The raga is mentioned in treatises such as the Gita Prakasa and Sangita Narayana. Among its angaragas, Mangala Gujjari is most prominent and has been used by Jayadeva in his Gita Govinda, alongside Gujjari itself.

Structure 
An ancient raga, Gujjari has been used by hundreds of poet-composers for well-over the past many centuries. Its aroha-abaroha are given below :

Aroha : S R g M P d n S

Abaroha : S n d P M g R S

The raga dwells or does nyasa on the rusabha, as per tradition.

Compositions 
Some of the well-known traditional compositions in this raga include :

 Syama Nagara Pari by Banamali Dasa
 Mane Ki Panchila Re by Upendra Bhanja

References 

Ragas of Odissi music